Someone Is Waiting is the second studio album by Taiwanese Mandopop singer-songwriter William Wei. It was released on August 3, 2012, by Linfair Records. The album consists of 11 tracks.

Track listing

Music videos

References

2012 albums
William Wei albums